Gallibacterium is a genus of bacteria from the family of Pasteurellaceae.
Gallibacterium bacteria are pathogens for chicken.

References

Pasteurellales
Bacteria genera